Cantung Mine is a tungsten producer in the Nahanni area of the Northwest Territories, Canada, located northeast of Watson Lake in the Flat River Valley of the Selwyn Range close to the Yukon border. Tungsten was originally discovered in the area in 1954 by prospectors. Cantung Mine operated from 1962 to 1986, again from 2002 to 2003, and from 2005. Production was suspended from October 2009 to October 2010. The mine owner, North American Tungsten Corporation, went bankrupt in 2015 and the mine closed in October of that year. The federal government of Canada now owns the mine and has to clean up the site.  As of December, 2017, the mine remained closed, with the possibility of being opened to process a nearby lithium deposit.
As of February 2019, the mine is still closed; the federal and NWT governments are trying to sell it.

1962—1986
The original company that developed the mine was Canada Tungsten Mining Corporation Limited, with Cantung being a short abbreviated form of the company name. The small community of Tungsten was established for workers and their families along with the small, still open, Tungsten (Cantung) Airport. It was an open-pit operation until 1974 when the newly discovered underground deposit was brought to production. It closed due to low tungsten prices in 1986. It was purchased by North American Tungsten Corporation of Vancouver in 1997. Stephen Leahy, Chair and CEO, recognized the potential for Cantung tungsten production because 85% of the world's tungsten reserves are in China:

2002—2003
With higher prices in the new millennium, the new owner, North American Tungsten Corporation, reopened the mine for production in 2002. The mine again closed in 2003 when the company's creditors recalled their loans, putting the company on the verge of bankruptcy.

2005—present
After a re-finance, the mine reopened September 1, 2005. By November 2007, North American Tungsten stated that Cantung had approximately two years of tungsten reserves left, but combined with its Mactung mine operation, the two hold 15% of the world's known tungsten. Leahy is optimistic:

References

Further reading

 2005. "Mine Development News - Cantung Restart Set for August; Implats Joins Dynatec at Ambatovy". Canadian Mining Journal. 126, no. 5: 6.
 2002. "CanTung Mine Back in Production". CIM Bulletin. 95, no. 1065: 11.

External links
 North American Tungsten

Tungsten mines in Canada
Mines in the Northwest Territories